Saltlands Studio is a recording studio based in New York City neighborhood of Dumbo, Brooklyn, founded in 2007 by owner Steve Salett and partners Dawn Landes and Gary Maurer. It was later joined by music producers and engineers Eli Janney, Jim Smith, and Aaron Rutledge. The studio gained notoriety with records by French Kicks, Alexi Murdoch, Josh Ritter, The Soft Pack, Wilco, Robbers on High Street, Obits, and the Trachtenburg Family Slideshow Players. The studio also functions as a collective of commercial composers, and in the spring of 2010 the studio received attention for the composition of the song that was awarded the Cannes Lions 2010 "Best Use of Music in a Commercial" Award for the Match.com commercial.

In 2010, Larry Crane interviewed Dawn Landes of Saltlands. The article was featured in Issue No. 80 of TapeOp.  In March 2011, Janice Brown of SonicScoop interviewed Steve Salett and producer/engineer Gary Maurer.

Artists and visiting producers who have recorded at Saltlands include:

 Alexi Murdoch
 Allie Moss
 Andrew Vladeck
 Anne Heaton
 Annie Keating
 Arizona
 Au Revoir Simone
 Balthrop, Alabama
 The Bandana Splits
 Benjamin Cartel
 Bob Hoffnar
 Brendan Canty
 Brian Bender
 Caithlin De Marrais
 Chris Erikson
 Dawn Landes
 Don Piper
 Doveman
 Drazy Hoops
 End Up Records
 The Famous Letters
 The Fancy Shapes
 Frally
 French Kicks
 Geoff Sanoff
 The Gray Goods
 Girl Friday
 Hem
 Ithaca
 Jason Mercer
 Jeff Hill
 Jeremy Sisto
 Jesse Neumann and Wolf Face
 Jolie Holland
 Josh Ritter
 Julia Steele Allen
 Mark Ganzglass
 Matt Shane
 Matt Trowbridge
 Michael Shannon
 Milan McKinnley
 Motion City Soundtrack
 My Sister in 1994
 The Ne'er Do Evers
 Nick Stumpf
 Nick Zinner
 Norden Bombsight
 Obits
 The Oxygen Ponies
 Pela
 Peter Salett
 The Poison Tree
 The Present
 PROJECT Trio
 Randy Russo
 Ray Rizzo
 Robbers on High Street
 Ryan Miller (Guster)
 Rusty Santos (Animal Collective, The Present)
 Sam Amidon
 Sam Kassirer
 Sarah Blust
 Seb Leon
 Shahzad Ismaily (Tom Waits)
 Sondre Lerche
 Thieving Irons
 Thom Monahan
 Tim "Love" Lee
 Tjeerd Bomhof (Voicst)
 Trachtenburg Family Slideshow Players
 Tuppy the Band
 Turner Cody
 Walter Martin
 We Are Augustines
 Wilco

See also
 So Runs the World Away
 Swimming
 The Soft Pack

References

External links 

 
 Saltlands at sonicscoop.com
 Saltlands: A Recording Studio in Brooklyn's Dumbo at newbeats.com
 Musical Rooms Part 21 Dawn Landes at musicalrooms.wordpress.com
 Dawn Landess Secret Dauce at huffingtonpost.com
 Making What Lasts -- Episode 70: Life&Death Dawn&Tom at vimeo.com

Recording studios in New York City